The SABCA S.2 was an airliner built in Belgium in 1926.

Design and development
The S.2 was a conventional, high-wing cantilever monoplane with fixed, tailskid undercarriage. The flight deck was open, but the passenger cabin was fully enclosed. Power was provided by a single engine in the nose, driving a two-blade propeller, and whose exhaust was collected in a single stack that extended up over the wing. Metal was construction throughout, with corrugated skin. Only a single example was built, which served with SABENA.

Specifications

Notes

References

 
 

1920s Belgian airliners
S.2
Single-engined tractor aircraft
High-wing aircraft
Aircraft first flown in 1926